Paul M. Taylor (born 1982) is a Canadian food security & anti-racism activist and former executive director of FoodShare Toronto. He is currently the co-CEO of Evenings & Weekends Consulting.

In 2020, Taylor and colleagues delivered 20,232 free food boxes to food-insecure people in Toronto. In 2022, he announced that his organization would pay interviewed job applicants $75 for their time.

Taylor ran for election as the federal member of parliament for Parkdale—High Park twice, and lost both times to Arif Virani.

Early life 
Taylor was born in Toronto in 1982, the second son to a mother from Saint Kitts; they grew up in a household that was reliant on government financial support.

Career 
Taylor was previously the executive director of Gordon Neighbourhood House, and in 2017 he became the executive director of FoodShare Toronto. In the role he is known for drawing links between food security and racism. At the start of the COVID-19 pandemic he delivered 20,232 free food boxes to Canadians with food insecurity. In March 2022, he announced that FoodShare Toronto would pay all employees a living wage and pay all interviewed job applicants $75. 

Taylor teaches at Simon Fraser University. He serves on the British Columbia board of directors of Canadian Centre for Policy Alternatives and has previously served on the board of directors of Metro Vancouver Alliance and Food Secure Canada. He is the founder of the Vancouver Food Summit and the co-chair of British Columbia's Poverty Reduction Coalition.

Taylor ran for election as the New Democratic Party candidate for Parkdale—High Park in 2019 and 2021, losing to Arif Virani both times.

References

External links 
 2021 Globe and Mail OpEd Do you work in a non-profit? Now’s the time to convince your directors to push for political change

1982 births

Living people
Activists from Toronto
Food security
New Democratic Party candidates for the Canadian House of Commons
Canadian chief executives
Canadian anti-racism activists